Times Like These is an album by vibraphonist Gary Burton recorded in 1988 and released on the GRP label. The all-star quartet includes guitarist John Scofield, bassist Marc Johnson and former Weather Report drummer Peter Erskine. Tenor saxophonist Michael Brecker sits in on two tracks.

Reception 
The Allmusic review by Scott Yanow awarded the album 4½ stars stating "Burton sounds fine on the diverse material. Since John Scofield had not had an opportunity to record with the vibraphonist during his year with Burton's Quartet more than a decade earlier, this fine set made up for lost time".

Track listing
 Times Like These" (Makoto Ozone) - 6:33   
 "Or Else" (Vince Mendoza) - 4:45   
 "Robert Frost" (Jay Leonhart) - 6:27   
 "Why'd You Do It?" (John Scofield) - 5:16   
 "P.M." (Chick Corea) - 6:30   
 "Was It Long Ago?" (Gary Burton) - 7:47   
 "Bento Box" (Ozone) - 6:16   
 "Do Tell" (Scofield) - 7:21  
Recorded at Clinton Studios, NYC

Personnel 
 Gary Burton — vibraphone, marimba
 John Scofield — guitar
 Marc Johnson — bass
 Peter Erskine — drums
 Michael Brecker — tenor saxophone (tracks 1 & 6)

References 

GRP Records albums
Gary Burton albums
1988 albums